P. S. Ellappan was an Indians politician and former Member of the Legislative Assembly of Tamil Nadu. He was elected to the Tamil Nadu legislative assembly as a Swatantra Party candidate from Acharapakkam constituency in  1967 election.

References 

Tamil Nadu politicians
Tamil Nadu MLAs 1967–1972